Monzo is a 2014 video game developed by Madfinger Games. The game is a simulator of building plastic models.

Gameplay
The player can build multiple types of models including cars, airplanes, weapons, bikes, etc. The player can also choose the level of complexity. The model can be reviewed when finished.

Reception
The Game has received mostly mixed reviews from critics.

148Apps praised the Idea for an App but criticised the Business Model.

Pocket Gamer praised the detailed Models but criticised that Monzo anaesthetises the whole experience of the physical Creation Process. The Business Model was also criticised with notion that buying new Models isn't worth the Price.

The game has received Czech Game of 2014 Award in Category The Best Original Game.

References

External links
Official Site

2014 video games
Android (operating system) games
IOS games
Madfinger Games games
Simulation video games
Single-player video games
Video games developed in the Czech Republic